Tom Mundell, better known as Metrik, is an English electronic music producer from London. He has been releasing records since 2007 and currently is one of the top drum and bass producers in the world, with 650,000 monthly listeners on Spotify as of spring 2022.

History

2010–12: Early career 
In 2010, Metrik released his debut EP, The Departure EP, on Viper Recordings, which included "T-1000" as well as collaborations with Jan Burton ("The Arrival" / "Learn To Fly") and techno producers Christian Smith & John Selway ("The Departure"). In 2011 he released Between Worlds EP on Viper Recordings which included "T-2000" and "I See You" which featured vocals from house singer Kathy Brown. In 2012 he released Flightwave EP as a free download. Later that year he released one of his one of his most iconic tracks, "Freefall", featuring the vocals of Australian singer Reija Lee.

2012–16: Universal Language 
In November 2012, he signed exclusively to Hospital Records. Soon after he was invited to do the prestigious BBC Radio 1 Essential Mix and appeared on the front cover of Computer Music Magazine with a Producer Masterclass. His 2014 single "Want My Love" (featuring Elisabeth Troy) became his first charting single peaking at number 61 in the UK Singles Chart and no. 31 in the UK Dance Chart. His debut album, Universal Language was released on 29 September 2014, following the album's second single "Human Again" (featuring Jan Burton), peaking at no. 13 in the UK Dance Chart.  "Believe" was featured on Microsoft's Forza Horizon 2 and "Make the Floor Burn VIP" was featured in Season 4 Episode 1 of Luther. His collaboration with Friction “Legacy" was used as the lead track for Hospital Records's milestone "We Are 18" album. In 2015 Metrik collaborated with Belgian drum & bass artist Netsky on "Can’t Speak" (featuring Stealth) and remixed Enter Shikari’s "The Appeal & The Mindsweep I".

2016–2018: LIFE/THRILLS 
On 7 October 2016, Metrik released his second album LIFE/THRILLS with critical acclaim and hit number 4 in the UK Dance Chart. The album amassed over 6 million streams on Spotify in its first year of release and spawned three singles. "Chasing Sunrise" (featuring Elisabeth Troy) became BBC Radio 1's "Track Of The Day", reached number 2 in Radio 1's Specialist Chart and playlisted for 6 weeks on Apple Music Beats 1. "LIFE/THRILLS" (feat. NAMGAWD) featured on the Sony Xperia TrackID Online advert and was licensed officially for the 2017 release of Gran Turismo Sport. "We Got It" (featuring Rothwell), the third and final single from LIFE/THRILLS was released in February 2017. The track reached over 2 million streams on Spotify and was awarded "Best Remix" at the Drum&BassArena Awards 2017. Other notable tracks "Cadence" and "Hi!" featured on Microsoft's Forza Horizon 3 and "Bring It Like That" featured on Wipeout Omega Collection. In December Metrik remixed "X-Ray" by Sub Focus which hit number 1 on the Beatport drum & bass chart. Metrik was interviewed by DJ Mag, UKF and The Sun.

In January 2017, Metrik joined BBC Radio 1 as a resident DJ and embarked on an extensive tour across Europe, USA, Canada, Japan, Australia and New Zealand with notable festival performances at Reading & Leeds, Glastonbury, Bestival, EDC Las Vegas, Hospitality in the Park and others. His performance at Bestival alongside Dynamite MC was broadcast live on BBC Radio 1. In May he performed at the Sony PlayStation Headquarters showcasing the official launch of WipeOut Omega. The livestream was viewed over 15 million times on streaming platform Twitch. The year birthed a new working relationship with Dolby as an ambassador for Dolby Atmos for Music, an initiative bringing immersive audio to live music venues. Metrik premiered the first-ever drum and bass show in Dolby Atmos to a sold-out crowd at Sound-Bar in Chicago as part of his Autumn 2017 USA tour. Later in the year, Metrik was a featured artist at the Ableton Loop summit for music makers at Funkhaus in Berlin, and led a masterclass on production techniques for Dolby Atmos content creation and mastering tools.

Metrik has remixed selected works of Eric Prydz, Swedish House Mafia, DJ Fresh & Ellie Goulding, Sub Focus, Martin Garrix & Sander van Doorn, Skepta, Enter Shikari, Gorgon City, Dirtyphonics, Ayah Marar, Camo & Krooked and John B on labels such as EMI, Parlophone, 3Beat, Ministry of Sound, Hospital Records, Dim Mak Records, Spinnin' and Destined Records.

2019–present: Ex Machina 
In April 2019, the song "Hackers" was released, revealing a less mainstream approach, and in September Metrik released "Gravity". 

Amongst other Hospital Records artists, he performed at "Hospitality Berlin" on 13 April 2019, "Hospitality Summer BBQ" on 4 May 2019, at "Hospitality Bristol BBQ" on 8 June 2019 and "Hospitality In The Park" on 21 September 2019. Festival appearances included "A Weird & Wonderful Day Out" and Beat-Herder, he also performed at Fabric on 24 May 2019.

In February 2020, Metrik released "We Are The Energy" via Hospital Records. In June 2020, his third studio album, Ex Machina was released along the single "Parallel" which features Grafix. In July, Metrik released a new song featuring ShockOne, titled "Dying Light".

Metrik was voted best producer of 2020 in the Drum&BassArena Awards.

Discography

Studio albums

Extended plays and singles

Remixes

References

External links
 
 Metrik at Hospital Records
 
 
 

English DJs
English drum and bass musicians
English record producers
People from Guildford
Living people
1986 births